The Institute of Chartered Accountants of Nepal (ICAN) was established under a special act, The Nepal Chartered Accountants Act, 1997 to enhance social recognition and faith of people at large in the accounting profession by raising public awareness towards the importance of accounting profession as well as towards economic and social responsibility of the accountants, and to contribute towards economic development of the country. The Institute is an autonomous body and the Council is fully authorized by the Act to undertake accountancy profession in Nepal.

History

Constitution of Council

Section 7 of the Nepal Chartered Accountants Act 1997, provides for the constitution of the Council of the Institute as follows:
 There shall be a Council of the Institute for the management of the affairs of the Institute and for discharging the functions assigned to it under this act.
 The Council shall be composed of the following persons, namely:
 Ten persons elected by chartered accountant members of the Institute from amongst the chartered accountant members of the Institute
 Four persons elected by registered auditor members of the Institute from amongst the registered auditor members of the Institute
 Three persons nominated by the Government of Nepal.

Present Council Members

1st Council Members (1997 - 2000)

2nd Council Members (2000 - 2003)

3rd Council Members (2003 - 2006)

4th Council Members (2006 - 2009)

5th Council Members (2009 - 2012)

6th Council Members (2012 - 2015)

7th Council Members (2015 - 2018)

8th Council Members (2018 - 2021)

Total members (2021/22)

Controversies

Tax exemption controversy
Two practising chartered accountants, Lumba Dhwaj Mahat and Umesh Prasad Dhakal, were involved in misappropriating state tax revenue through dubious tax settlements as Chairman and Member of Tax Settlement Commission involving Chudamani Sharma, Director General of Inland Revenue Department (Nepal). The corruption scam was considered as one of the biggest in the Nepalese history. ICAN disciplinary committee failed to take any action against the two accused CAs. Vice-Chairman Jagannath Upadhyay Niraula said that "the disciplinary committee can take action only after receiving information or the complaint is lodged against any chartered accountant. We have not received any complaint against the duo." The fraud amounted to NRs. 21 billion. Both the CAs have fled from the incident and were declared fugitive by Commission for the Investigation of Abuse of Authority.

Bharatpur Listing controversy
46 Nepalese audit firms, including the firm of former President of ICAN CA Prakash Jung Thapa (i.e. PJ Thapa & Company), were listed in the Bharatpur Municipality against the legal regulations of ICAN. On 18 October 2019, ICAN President Krishna Prasad Acharya has declared to punish the audit firms for conducting such illegal listing.

References

External links
 Institute of Chartered Accountants of Nepal
 ICAN Annual Report 2006 (PDF), ican.org.np

Professional associations based in Nepal
Member bodies of the International Federation of Accountants
1997 establishments in Nepal